Paul S. Davison (born 1 October 1971) is an English former professional snooker player from Pickering, North Yorkshire. First earning a place on the World Snooker Tour in 1992, he played on the tour until 1997, and has since regained his place on the Tour on three further occasions, most recently in the 2018-19 snooker season. Davison reached a peak of 70th in the world snooker rankings in 2012, and the farthest into a ranking tournament at the 2017 Riga Masters. He has made a total of 76 professional century breaks, the highest being a 144 made in qualifying for the 2001 World Snooker Championship.

Career

Early career

In the 2009–10 season he finished third in the PIOS rankings, and thus retained his place on the 2010/2011 professional Main Tour. He came through three qualification matches, concluding with a narrow 5–4 victory over Dominic Dale, to progress to the wildcard round of the 2012 German Masters. He beat Pole Krzysztof Wróbel 5–2 to reach the main stage of a ranking event for the first time, drawing reigning UK Champion Judd Trump and was soundly beaten 1–5 in only 75 minutes.

The run earned him valuable ranking points as he continued to strive towards his goal of getting into the top 64 in the world to ensure his place on the tour for next season. However, he did not win another match in the remainder of the season and finished it ranked world number 81, meaning he had to enter Q School to have a chance of playing in the 2012–13 season. In May, Davison won five matches at the second Q School event, concluding with a 4–2 win over Gareth Allen to earn a place on the tour for the next two years.

2012/2013 season
Davison almost qualified for the 2012 International Championship, the fourth ranking event of the 2012/2013 season. He saw off Fraser Patrick, Peter Lines and Ben Woollaston, but then lost 3–6 to Dominic Dale in the final round. Davison had a consistent year in the minor-ranking Players Tour Championship Events, with his best result coming in the third European Tour Event, where he beat Ricky Norris, Joel Walker and Chris Norbury, before losing to world number one Mark Selby 3–4 in the last 16. He reached the last 32 on two other occasions which helped Davison finish 48th on the PTC Order of Merit. Davison's season ended when he lost 7–10 to Alfie Burden in the second round of World Championship Qualifying, which saw him end the year ranked world number 75.

2013/2014 season
In the qualifiers for the Australian Goldfields Open Davison won his first match of the season 5–4 against Andrew Norman, making a 141 break during the match. Further wins over Peter Lines and Mark King followed to see Davison into the main draw of a ranking event for the second time in his career. In the first round he made breaks of 112 and 124 to lead Mark Davis 4–3 with his opponent requiring a snooker with one red left. Davis got the snooker on the final pink and potted the pink and black to level the match. Davison also led the deciding frame 49–10 but would ultimately lose the match 5–4. Davison defeated Gerard Greene 6–4 in the first round of the UK Championship and raced into a 3–0 second round lead against world number seven Shaun Murphy, before conceding six frames in a row to exit the event. After the match Davison said that he loved the experience and had done very little wrong in the match as Murphy's fightback was as good matchplay snooker as you could see.

Davison's second last 32 appearance of the season came at the German Masters after he recorded one of the best results of his career by knocking out world number nine Marco Fu 5–2. He led Rod Lawler 4–1 in the next round but could not reach the last 16 of a ranking event for the first time as he was defeated 5–4. After Davison lost 10–2 against Alan McManus in World Championship qualifying he could no longer reach the top 64 in the world rankings as he was placed 82nd and therefore played in Q School in an attempt to earn his place back. He lost in the last 64 in both events to fall well short of doing so.

2014/2015 season

Davison played in all six of the minor-ranking European Tour events during the 2014–15 season. His best performance came at the Riga Open, where he reached the last 32 with 4–3 and 4–1 wins over Jack Lisowski and Gerard Greene respectively, but he then lost 4–2 to Matthew Selt. A 4–3 victory against Kyren Wilson at the Paul Hunter Classic was his only other win in a European Tour event, with Davison losing 4–3 to Dechawat Poomjaeng in the subsequent round. He had two chances to rejoin the professional tour. The first came at the EBSA Play-offs where Davison was knocked out 4–3 by Martin O'Donnell in round two. His second came at Q School and in event two Davison won six games, concluding with a 4–3 victory over Luke Simmonds to earn a two-year tour card.

2015/2016 season
Davison lost eight matches in a row from October 2015 until April 2016 when he beat Yu Delu 10–9 in the first round of World Championship. He lost 10–7 to Thepchaiya Un-Nooh in the following round. He only won a total of four matches all season.

2016/2017 season
Davison knocked out three players to reach the final qualifying round for the Shanghai Masters, but he was thrashed 5–0 by Anthony McGill. He recovered from 2–0 down against Gary Wilson in the opening round of the UK Championship to win 6–3, before losing 6–4 to Ben Woollaston. After beating Joe Swail 4–0 in the first round of the Welsh Open, Davison was defeated 4–1 by Zhou Yuelong. He qualified for the China Open, but lost 5–0 in the opening round to Ding Junhui and entered Q School again to try and stay on the tour as he would have been relegated from it at the end of the season due to being ranked world number 91. He won through to the final round of the first event and was defeated 4–2 by Billy Joe Castle. Davison also got to the final round of the second event and this time beat James Cahill 4–2 to remain on tour and mean he has successfully advanced through Q School three times.

Performance and rankings timeline

Career finals

Non-ranking finals: 2

Pro-am finals: 2

Amateur finals: 7 (4 titles)

References

External links 

Paul Davison at worldsnooker.com

1971 births
Living people
People from Pickering, North Yorkshire
English snooker players
Sportspeople from North Yorkshire